Prevention of diabetes may refer to:
 Prevention of prediabetes
 Prevention of diabetes mellitus type 1
 Prevention of diabetes mellitus type 2